French Federation of Ice Sports (or French Ice Sports Federation;  or FFSG) is the national governing body for a number of ice sports in France.

It manages completely different sports disciplines whose only commonality is that they are practiced on ice. This explains the structural complexity of the organization.

Sport disciplines 
The French Federation of Ice Sports manages several groups of sports:
 Artistic sports: figure skating, ice dance, synchronized skating, and ballet on ice
 Performance sports on ice rink: speed skating, and short track
 Performance sports on ice track: bobsleigh, luge, and skeleton
 Team sport: curling

From 1942 to 2006, the FFSG also managed French ice hockey. Creation of the French Ice Hockey Federation on April 29, 2006 established an independent body to supervise this sport.

Mission 
 See the section "Missions" in the French Wikipedia.

Presidents of the FFSG

References 

 Le livre d'or du patinage d'Alain Billouin, éditions Solar, 1999

External links 
 

Ice Sport
Figure skating in France
National governing bodies for ice skating
Speed skating in France
Short-track speed skating
Bobsleigh in France
Sport in Paris
Organizations based in Paris
1942 establishments in France
Sports organizations established in 1942
Curling in France
Curling governing bodies